Belthara Road is a Nagar Panchayat city with a railway station in the north-western corner of Ballia district of Uttar Pradesh, India.

Belthara Road is the sub-district headquarters. District headquarters of the city is Ballia which is 60 km away.

Demographics
According to the 2011 census, in 2011 Belthara Road Nagar Panchayat had a population of 20,404 - 10,564 males and 9,840 females, giving a sex ratio of 931. There were 2476 children under 7 whilst the literacy rate of 85.78% is much higher than the state average of 67.68%.

Town Area

The main market area starts from Railway station to Bus Station and its multiple connected road and the road which connect Railway station to Trimuhani followed by Chaukia Mod.Here are Key Landmark of Belthara Road 

 Railway Station 
 Mandir in Railway Compound 
 Dak Bangla 
 Jama Masjid 
 Bichla Pokhra Mandir Area 
 Ramlila Ground 
 Shiv Mandir 
 Bus Station 
 Trimuhani
 Baranwal Dharmshala

Schools 

 Dayanand Anglo-Vedic Inter College: One of the oldest schools in the town for sixth- to twelfth-grade students, it is next to the railway station.
 Gandhi Mohammad Ali Memorial (G M A M) Inter College: Another old school for sixth- to twelfth-grade boys, it is also next to the railway station.
 Shayam Sundari Girls Inter College: Girls-only school
 Devendra P. G. Degree College: On the Belthara-Madhuban Road
 Green Lawns Public School near Nagar Panchayat Office on 
 Late Kesav Prasad Mahavidyalay & PG College,  Sasana Bhadurpur
 M. M. D. Public School: Secondary co-ed school with dormitory facilities
 NavJeevan English School: Secondary co-ed school
 New Central Public School (Nursery to 10th+2 C.B.S.E.Pat) near Vishal Talkies.
 Nirmal Jeevan Public School, near Indouli Gram sabha.
 Nisva Junior High School Bahorwa, Belthara Road ballia 
 St. Xavier's School, Belthara Road (Nursery to 10th+2 C.B.S.E.Pat) near Piprauli Bada Gaon One of the oldest CBSE Board School
 D N Children school is located in kundail near to railway station

Attractions 
 Indauli, a temple of Lord Shiva & Dihbaba, Ramlila
 The Bhageshwari temple, dedicated to the goddess of the same name, is between Ballia and Belthara Road and is the most-visited place of worship by local Hindus. A month-long annual fair, Sonadih Mela, is held here in conjunction with Navratri.
 Ghaghara river and its bank

References 

Cities and towns in Ballia district